Seton Mains Halt was a railway halt of the North British Railway, located between the current Prestonpans and Longniddry railway stations, opposite Seton Gardens/Entrance to Seton Castle. The signal box and halt have been demolished. It had a booking office and a platform.

Routes

References

Notes 

The "EdinPhoto" website has photograph with a locomotive and carriages at the Halt in 1928: Seton Mains Halt - 1928

Disused railway stations in East Lothian
Former North British Railway stations
Railway stations in Great Britain opened in 1914
Railway stations in Great Britain closed in 1930